Gymnelopsis is a genus of marine ray-finned fishes belonging to the family Zoarcidae, the eelpouts. The fishes in this genus are found in the northwestern Pacific Ocean.

Species
The following species are classified within the genus Gymnelopsis:

Gymnelopsis japonica (Katayama 1943) is recognised as a valid species by the Catalog of Fishes but is not included in FishBase.

References

Gymnelinae